Connor Niall Hughes (born 6 May 1993) is an English semi-professional footballer who plays as a midfielder for Daisy Hill. He played for Oldham Athletic in the Football League as a professional footballer.

Career

Oldham Athletic
Hughes joined Oldham Athletic in May 2009 on a two-year scholarship.

After playing for the youth and reserves, he made his first-team debut as a substitute in a Football League match on 17 March 2012.

Hyde
On 31 May 2013, Hughes signed for Hyde on a one-year deal. He made his debut for the club on 17 August 2013, coming on as a second-half substitute in Hyde's 2–2 draw with Hereford United. He scored his first league goal for the club in their 5–2 home defeat to Wrexham on 28 December 2013.

Halifax
He joined Halifax on 15 July 2015. Bradford Park Avenue signed Hughes on a month's loan in October 2015.

Stalybridge Celtic
In November 2017 he joined Stalybridge Celtic.

Curzon Ashton
In the summer of 2018 he joined Curzon Ashton.

Ashton United
The following summer he moved to Ashton United. On 20 December 2019, Hughes returned to Hyde on a one-month loan. He then joined Radcliffe F.C. on a one-month loan on 1 February 2020. The deal was later extended.

Widnes
In September 2020 he joined Widnes.

Career statistics
Up to date, as of 3 July 2013.

Honours
FC Halifax Town
FA Trophy: 2015–16

References

External links

Player profile at OldhamAthletic.co.uk

Living people
Oldham Athletic A.F.C. players
Hyde United F.C. players
English Football League players
1993 births
Footballers from Bolton
Bradford (Park Avenue) A.F.C. players
FC Halifax Town players
Association football midfielders
English footballers
Worcester City F.C. players
Warrington Town F.C. players
Stalybridge Celtic F.C. players
Curzon Ashton F.C. players
Ashton United F.C. players
Radcliffe F.C. players
Widnes F.C. players